J